Radequinil (INN; AC-3933) is a cognitive enhancer which acts as a partial inverse agonist of the benzodiazepine site of the GABAA receptor. It was under development by Dainippon Sumitomo Pharma for the treatment of Alzheimer's disease and made it to phase II clinical trials but development seems to have been halted and it was never marketed.

See also 
 GABAA receptor negative allosteric modulator
 GABAA receptor § Ligands

References 

Nootropics
Oxadiazoles
Lactams
GABAA receptor negative allosteric modulators
Phenol ethers
Naphthyridines